The 2022 ABA League First Division Playoffs is the basketball play-off tournament that decides the winner of the 2021–22 ABA League First Division season.

Qualified teams 
  Crvena zvezda mts
  Partizan NIS
  Budućnost VOLI
  Cedevita Olimpija
  Igokea m:tel
  FMP Meridian

Bracket
On 13 September 2021, the ABA League JTD decided that six highest-placed clubs from the Regular season will qualify for the Playoffs.

Preliminary round

|}

Game 1

Budućnost VOLI vs. FMP Meridian

Cedevita Olimpija vs. Igokea m:tel

Game 2

FMP Meridian vs. Budućnost VOLI

Igokea m:tel vs. Cedevita Olimpija

Semifinals

|}

Game 1

Crvena zvezda mts vs. Cedevita Olimpija

Partizan NIS vs. Budućnost VOLI

Game 2

Cedevita Olimpija vs. Crvena zvezda mts

Budućnost VOLI vs. Partizan NIS

Game 3

Crvena zvezda mts vs. Cedevita Olimpija

Partizan NIS vs. Budućnost VOLI

Finals

|}

Game 1

Game 2

Game 3

Game 4

Game 5

See also
 2022 ABA League Second Division Playoffs

References

External links 
 Official website
 ABA League at Eurobasket.com

2021–22 in Montenegrin basketball
2021–22 in Serbian basketball
2021–22 in Bosnia and Herzegovina basketball